Qasem Saedi (Persian: قاسم ساعدی) (born: 1965, in Dasht-e Azadegan County, Khuzestan province) is a principlist representative of Dashte-Azadegan and Hoveyzeh in the Islamic Consultative Assembly (the Parliament of Iran) who was elected at the 11th Majles elections on 21 February 2020 and captured about 20,000 votes.

Qasem Saedi who is a Twelver Shia Muslim and an Ahwazi Arab, is considered as one of the 18 representatives of Khuzestan provinces at the current "Islamic Consultative Assembly" (11th parliament).

See also
 List of Iran's parliament representatives (11th term)
 Majid Naseri Nejad

References

Members of the Islamic Consultative Assembly by term
Members of the 11th Islamic Consultative Assembly
Living people
People from Khuzestan Province
Iranian politicians
Members of the 10th Islamic Consultative Assembly
People from Ahvaz
1965 births